The women's 10 kilometre freestyle pursuit cross-country skiing competition at the 1992 Winter Olympics in Albertville, France, was held on Saturday 15 February at Les Saisies. This was the first time a pursuit race was held in cross-country skiing at the Winter Olympics.

Each skier started based on the results from the 5 km classical event on 13 February, skiing the entire 10 kilometre course after the first-to-finish principle. Marjut Lukkarinen won the 5 km classical race with 0.9 seconds to Lyubov Yegorova of the Unified team. The two skiers started the pursuit simultaneously and Yegorova took over the lead and won over Italian Stefania Belmondo with 24.1 seconds.

Results
The time consists the added times for both the 5 km classical and the 10 km freestyle pursuit.

References

External links
 Final results (International Ski Federation)

Women's cross-country skiing at the 1992 Winter Olympics
Women's pursuit cross-country skiing at the Winter Olympics